Taykash (Tayqaş) is a rural locality (a village) in Yavgildinsky Selsoviet, Karaidelsky District, Bashkortostan, Russia. The population was 547 as of 2010. There are 6 streets.

Geography 
Taykash is located 38 km west of Karaidel (the district's administrative centre) by road. Kazanka is the nearest rural locality.

References 

Rural localities in Karaidelsky District